Tan Thanh may refer to several populated places in Vietnam:

Tân Thành 
Communes, wards in Bình Phước province
 Tân Thành, Đồng Xoài, a commune of Đồng Xoài
 Tân Thành, Bù Đốp District, a commune of Bù Đốp District
Communes, wards in Cà Mau province
 Tân Thành (ward), Cà Mau, a ward of Cà Mau
 Tân Thành (commune), Cà Mau, a commune of Cà Mau
Communes in Lạng Sơn Province
 Tân Thành, Bắc Sơn District, a commune of Bắc Sơn District
 Tân Thành, Cao Lộc District,  a commune of Cao Lộc District
 Tân Thành, Hữu Lũng District, a commune of Hữu Lũng District
Communes in Long An Province
 Tân Thành, Mộc Hóa District, a commune of Mộc Hóa District
 Tân Thành, Tân Thạnh District, a commune of Tân Thạnh District
 Tân Thành, Thủ Thừa District, a commune of Thủ Thừa District
Communes, wards in Ninh Bình Province
 Tân Thành, Ninh Bình, a ward of Ninh Bình
 Tân Thành, Kim Sơn District, a commune of Kim Sơn District
Communes, wards in Thái Nguyên Province
 Tân Thành, Thái Nguyên, a ward of Thái Nguyên
 Tân Thành, Phú Bình District, a commune of Phú Bình District
Communes, wards, townships in other provinces of Vietnam
 Tân Thành, Tân Phú, a ward of Tân Phú District, Ho Chi Minh City
 Tân Thành, Hải Phòng, a ward of Dương Kinh District
 Tân Thành, Đăk Lắk, a ward of Buôn Ma Thuột
 Tân Thành, Bình Dương, a township and capital of Bắc Tân Uyên District
 Tân Thành, Hậu Giang, a commune of Ngã Bảy
 Tân Thành, Bình Thuận, a commune of Hàm Thuận Nam District
 Tân Thành, Đăk Nông, a commune of Krông Nô District
 Tân Thành, Đồng Tháp, a commune of Lai Vung District
 Tân Thành, Hà Giang, a commune of Bắc Quang District
 Tân Thành, Hòa Bình, a commune of Lương Sơn District
 Tân Thành, Kiên Giang, a commune of Tân Hiệp District
 Tân Thành, Lâm Đồng, a commune of Đức Trọng District
 Tân Thành, Nam Định, a commune of Vụ Bản District
 Tân Thành, Nghệ An, a commune of Yên Thành District
 Tân Thành, Quảng Trị, a commune of Hướng Hóa District
 Tân Thành, Tây Ninh, a commune of Tân Châu District, Tây Ninh
 Tân Thành, Thanh Hóa, a commune of Thường Xuân District
 Tân Thành, Tiền Giang, a commune of Gò Công Đông District
 Tân Thành, Tuyên Quang, a commune of Hàm Yên District
 Tân Thành, Vĩnh Long, a commune of Bình Tân District, Vĩnh Long
 Former Tân Thành District of Bà Rịa–Vũng Tàu province, dissolved in 2018 to form the new district-level town of Phú Mỹ

Tân Thạnh 
 Tân Thạnh District, a rural district of Long An Province
 Tân Thạnh, Quảng Nam, a ward of Tam Kỳ
 Tân Thạnh (township), a township and capital of Tân Thạnh District
 Tân Thạnh, Kiên Giang, a commune of An Minh District
 Tân Thạnh, Bạc Liêu, a commune of Giá Rai
 Tân Thạnh, Sóc Trăng, a commune of Long Phú District
 Tân Thạnh, An Giang, a commune of Tân Châu, An Giang
 Tân Thạnh, Tiền Giang, a commune of Tân Phú Đông District
 Tân Thạnh, Đồng Tháp, a commune of Thanh Bình District
 Tân Thạnh, Cần Thơ, a commune of Thới Lai District

Tân Thanh 
 Tân Thanh, Điện Biên, a ward of Điện Biên Phủ
 Tân Thanh, Bến Tre, a commune of Giồng Trôm District
 Tân Thanh, Bắc Giang, a commune of Lạng Giang District
 Tân Thanh, Lâm Đồng, a commune of Lâm Hà District
 Tân Thanh, Lạng Sơn, a commune of Văn Lãng District
 Tân Thanh, Tiền Giang, a commune of Cái Bè District

See also
 The communes of Tân Thành A and Tân Thành B in Tân Hồng District, Đồng Tháp Province
 Thanh Tân (disambiguation)